Charles Hammond Martin (September 11, 1881 – August 16, 1957) was a Canadian politician. He served as a Progressive Conservative Party of Ontario Member of Provincial Parliament in the Ontario Legislative Assembly for the riding of Haldimand—Norfolk from 1944 to 1951.

He was born at Walpole Township, Haldimand County in 1881, the son of George and Clara H. (née Strickler) Martin. He married Florence B. Saville on September 11, 1912 and had two children. He was a merchant and member in the firm of Martin Brothers. Martin was also active in the local Rotary Club. He died at his home in Simcoe, Ontario in 1957.

References

External links
 

1881 births
1957 deaths
Progressive Conservative Party of Ontario MPPs
People from Haldimand County